Greenhill Windmill is a traditional masonry tower windmill, built in 1856 at Greenhill Farm near Kyneton, Victoria, Australia.

Joseph Hall (1804-21 August 1871) and William Hoad purchased thirty hectares of farm land  located on Metcalfe Road, Green Hill, at the original Crown sales in 1855. The following year they erected the windmill, using bluestone quarried on their property.

Joseph Hall was born at Dacre, Kirkoswald, Cumberland, England, and married Annie Walton on 23 July 1831 at Kirkoswald. He became a local Kyneton pioneer who resided for a time at Sunbury Lodge prior to moving to Windmill Farm and then lived Park Hall, Lauriston where he died on 21 August 1871.

The property was bequeathed to the National Trust of Australia (Victoria) in 1984. is listed on the Victorian Heritage Register (H0311) and Shire of Metcalf Heritage Overlay (HO127) and is classified by the National Trust.

The mill is located at 1203 Kyneton-Metcalfe Road, Kyneton, Victoria 3444

External photo

References

 Windmill Farm conservation analysis, Kyneton, prepared for the National Trust of Australia (Victoria) by David Bick, Carlotta Kellaway, John Patrick ; & edited by Anne-Marie Treweeke, National Trust of Australia (Victoria) Melbourne, 1993.

Windmills in Australia
Tower mills
Grinding mills in Australia
Windmills completed in 1856
1856 establishments in Australia